Chandrachur Singh (born 11 October 1968) is an Indian actor, who mainly works in Hindi cinema. He is the recipient of a Filmfare Award, in addition to receiving nomination for an IIFA Award and a Screen Award.

Early life and career
Singh attended the all-boys boarding school The Doon School in Dehradun, and then went to St. Stephen's College, University of Delhi.

In the early 1990s, Singh, a trained classical singer, taught music at Vasant Valley School and history at his alma mater, The Doon School. Singh made his acting debut in 1996 in Tere Mere Sapne which was produced under Amitabh Bachchan Corporation Limited. Later that year he starred alongside Tabu in Maachis for which he won the Filmfare Award for Best Male Debut. He appeared in several films as a leading actor which failed to do well, but he had success with his lead roles in the multi-starers Daag: The Fire (1999) opposite Sanjay Dutt, Kya Kehna (2000) opposite Preity Zinta and Josh (2000) opposite Aishwarya Rai and Shah Rukh Khan, for which he won many popular votes. He was nominated for Filmfare Awards on two occasions, in different categories.

After initial successes, his career went into a low, because of multiple dislocations of his shoulder joint, which he suffered while water skiing in Goa. Because of the pain on his shoulder, he couldn't work out or stay fit which caused him to gain weight and lose roles. His last few releases included Aamdani Atthani Kharcha Rupaiyaa (2001), Bharat Bhagya Vidhata (2002) and the delayed release Sarhad Paar which was shot in 2002 and released in 2006. All three films flopped at the box office.

In 2012, he made a comeback with the multi-starer film Chaar Din Ki Chandni.<ref>{{Cite web|url=https://www.outlookindia.com/newsscroll/tough-times-dont-last-tough-people-do-chandrachur-singh-on-his-acting-comeback/1864996|title=Tough times dont last, tough people do: Chandrachur Singh on his acting comeback|website=Outlook India|access-date=11 October 2020|archive-date=11 October 2020|archive-url=https://web.archive.org/web/20201011125357/https://www.outlookindia.com/newsscroll/tough-times-dont-last-tough-people-do-chandrachur-singh-on-his-acting-comeback/1864996%7Ctitle%3DTough|url-status=live}}</ref> The film featured Tusshar Kapoor, Kulraj Randhawa, Anupam Kher, Om Puri and Farida Jalal in lead roles. Chaar Din Ki Chandni received a mixed response from critics, and turned out to be a flop at most places in India. Singh also played a role in the 2012 English-language film The Reluctant Fundamentalist, directed by Mira Nair. He then appeared in  Zilla Ghaziabad which had been delayed for years, and finally released in August 2013.

In 2020, he made his big acting comeback with Disney+ Hotstar crime drama television series Aarya'', opposite Sushmita Sen. It was directed by Ram Madhvani.

Filmography

Films

Television

References

External links 
 

Living people
Male actors in Hindi cinema
Indian male film actors
Indian male voice actors
The Doon School alumni
St. Stephen's College, Delhi alumni
Delhi University alumni
The Doon School faculty
1968 births
Filmfare Awards winners
Screen Awards winners